Treason is a 1918 American silent drama film directed by Burton L. King and starring Edna Goodrich. It was produced and distributed by Mutual Film Company and apparently was the last film released before the company ceased operations in 1918.

Cast
Edna Goodrich as The Wife
Howard Hall as The Husband
Mildred Clair as Child
Clarence Heritage as Major McClintock
Stuart Holmes as Anton Tell / Herr McGraff Von Aachen

Preservation
With no prints of Treason located in any film archives, it is a lost film.

References

External links

1918 films
American silent feature films
American black-and-white films
Mutual Film films
Films directed by Burton L. King
Lost American films
Silent American drama films
1918 drama films
1918 lost films
Lost drama films
1910s American films